In astronomy, quenching is a process in which a galaxy loses cold gas, thus strongly suppressing star formation, because stars are formed from Nebulae and Nebulae (before star formation kickstarts with increasing metallicity) are formed from accumulated Interstellar gas in the Interstellar medium (ISM). Evidence suggests that active supermassive black holes drive the process.

One common evolutionary path on the galaxy color–magnitude diagram may start with a blue spiral galaxy with much star formation. The black hole at its center may start growing rapidly, and somehow start quenching the galaxy, which relatively quickly transitions through the "green valley", ending up more red.

References 

Star formation
Black holes